Venus Williams was the defending champion, but did not compete this year.

Nathalie Dechy won the title by defeating Marie-Gaïané Mikaelian 6–3, 3–6, 6–3 in the final. It was the 1st and only title for Dechy in her singles career.

Seeds
The first two seeds received a bye into the second round.

Draw

Finals

Top half

Bottom half

References

 Main and Qualifying Rounds

Uncle Tobys Hardcourts - Singles
2003 Uncle Tobys Hardcourts